The 2005 season of the Finnish Veikkausliiga was won by MyPa.

League table

Results

Overview

References
Finland - List of final tables (RSSSF)

Veikkausliiga seasons
Fin
Fin
1